Christian S. M. Turney  is the Pro Vice-Chancellor for Research at the University of Technology Sydney. He was previously the Professor of Climate Change and Earth Science and Director of the Earth and Sustainability Science Research Centre and the Chronos 14Carbon-Cycle Facility at the University of New South Wales.

Education 
Turney was educated at St Bede's School, graduated from the University of East Anglia with a BSc in Environmental Science and completed his PhD at Royal Holloway, University of London.

Career and impact 
He was previously Professor of Physical Geography at the University of Exeter. He was awarded the J.G. Russell Award (2004) by the Australian Academy of Science, the inaugural Sir Nicholas Shackleton Medal by the International Union for Quaternary Research in 2007, a Philip Leverhulme Prize in 2008, the Bigsby Medal of the Geological Society of London in 2009, and the Frederick White Prize by the Australian Academy of Science in 2014. In 2010, Turney was awarded a five-year Australian Research Council Laureate Fellowship. He has published four books and more than 180 scientific research papers.

In 2013−2014, Turney led the Australasian Antarctic Expedition, a privately funded expedition to the Antarctic in the "Spirit of Mawson", to investigate environmental changes across the region and communicate the value of scientific research. Scientific findings include the recognition of a 1965 Carbon-14 peak preserved in "the Loneliest Tree in the World" and shrubs growing on Campbell Island, New Zealand, that offer a possible marker for the proposed Anthropocene Epoch in the geological timescale. On the return home Turney's ice-strengthened vessel became trapped by a substantial breakout of sea ice. His book on the expedition's discoveries and the team's experiences trapped by sea ice were published in Iced In: Ten Days Trapped on the Edge of Antarctica.; in Australia and New Zealand, the same book was published under the name of Shackled.

Turney was a Founding Director and now scientific advisor to New Zealand cleantech company CarbonScape, which has developed patented technology to produce and engineer carbon-negative graphite from biomass to be used in lithium-ion batteries.

In November 2021, University of Technology Sydney announced that Turney was going their university in January 2022 as their new Pro Vice-Chancellor for Research.

Publications 
Turney has published more than 210 research papers, 1 textbook and 4 popular science books, attracting more than 30,000 citations. He has an h-index of 63 on Google Scholar (54 on Scopus and 62 on ResearchGate). This output put Turney on the 2018 Clarivate Highly Cited Researcher list, representing the 1% most cited scientists in the world. In the past six years Turney has led Category 1 research projects worth more than $6 million (with a career total of $61 million).

Awards 

 Australian Academy of Science Frederick Stone Award (2014)
 Australian Laureate Fellowship (2010)
 Geological Society of London’s Bigsby Medal (2009)
 PhilipLevehulme Prize (2008) 
 International Union for Quaternary Research (INQUA) inaugural Sir Nicholas Shackleton Medal (2007)

References

Living people
Alumni of the University of East Anglia
Alumni of Royal Holloway, University of London
Academics of the University of Exeter
Academic staff of the University of New South Wales
Fellows of the Geological Society of London
Fellows of the Royal Geographical Society
Fellows of the Higher Education Academy
British Antarctic scientists
1973 births